Watching the Climbers on the Mountain is a novel by the Australian author Alex Miller.  It was first published in 1988 by Pan Books Australia  and was republished by Allen & Unwin in 2012.

Reviews

Interviews
Jane Sullivan, 'Interview: Alex Miller', 'The Sydney Morning Herald', October 5, 2013, accessed January 2014.

References

Peter Pierce, 2004, 'The solitariness of Alex Miller', Australian Literary Studies, 21 (3). pp. 299–311.  accessed January 2014.

Novels by Alex Miller
1988 Australian novels
Pan Books books